Mars is a rural locality (a village) in Novokalchirovsky Selsoviet, Aurgazinsky District, Bashkortostan, Russia. The population was 33 as of 2010. There is 1 street.

Geography 
Mars is located 12 km north of Tolbazy (the district's administrative centre) by road. Uksunny is the nearest rural locality.

References 

Rural localities in Aurgazinsky District